The 1914–15 season was the sixth year of football played by Dundee Hibernian, and covers the period from 1 July 1914 to 30 June 1915.

Match results
Dundee Hibernian played a total of 26 matches during the 1914–15 season.

Legend

All results are written with Dundee Hibernian's score first.
Own goals in italics

Second Division

References

Dundee United F.C. seasons
Dundee Hibernian